Dharmaram College is a major seminary of the Carmelites of Mary Immaculate congregation. It was relocated to Bangalore, India in 1957 from Chethipuzha in Kerala. It is the combination of the Sanskrit words dharma (virtue) and arāma (garden) or "Rāma" (Almighty, NOT Vishnu's avatar) that makes the word Dharmaram, which means 'Garden of Virtues'. The 'Garden of Virtues' symbolizes the Sacred Heart of Jesus to which Dharmaram is dedicated to. "Isabhakti Paramjnanam" (Love of God is the Supreme Wisdom) is the motto of Dharmaram. (It is to be noted that "Isa" could also mean "Ishwara" / Almighty)

The aim of Dharmaram is to form holistically, spiritually, intellectually and culturally future generation priests who are prepared to commit themselves to the service of the Church and the world.

References

External links
 Official Website of Carmelites of Mary Immaculate
 Official Website of Dharmaram College
 Location of Dharmaram college

Seminaries and theological colleges in India
Colleges in Bangalore